Knockhall Castle is a historic Scottish castle near to Newburgh, Aberdeenshire.

It was built by William Sinclair, 5th Lord Sinclair of Newburgh in 1565 for his eldest son Henry Sinclair, 6th Lord Sinclair.  James VI stayed on 9 July 1589. There is a stone door lintel carved with the date '1589 'in memorial of the royal visit.It was purchased by Clan Udny, who moved into the castle in 1634. The building was damaged in 1639 when taken by the Earl Marischal for the Covenanters, but was later returned to Udny hands. The Clan remained in the castle until 1734, when an accidental fire gutted the building and the Clan moved back to their other property, Udny Castle. Jamie Fleeman, the Laird of Udny's fool, is credited with saving the life of the family in the fire. The castle remains a ruin to this day and is designated a scheduled monument.

Reports in late 2019 indicated that the castle was for sale but redevelopment would require planning permission.

References

Houses completed in 1565
Ruined castles in Aberdeenshire
1565 establishments in Scotland
Scheduled Ancient Monuments in Aberdeenshire